The Shoemaker Mile Stakes is a Grade I American Thoroughbred horse race for horses age three years old and older over a distance of one mile on the turf held annually in late May at Santa Anita Park in Arcadia, California, USA.  The event currently carries a purse of $500,000.

History

Inaugurated in 1938 as the Premiere Handicap over a distance of six furlongs at Hollywood Park Racetrack in Inglewood, California.

In 1950, there were two separate races, one in the Spring called Preview Handicap at six furlongs and the autumn race as The Premiere Handicap at seven furlongs.

In 1984 & 1985, the event was run in two divisions and held on the turf for the first time.

In 1990 it was renamed to honor U.S. Racing Hall of Fame jockey Bill Shoemaker.

In 2014 when Hollywood Park Racetrack closed the race was moved to Santa Anita Park.

Distance
Since inception, the race has been contested at a variety of distances:
 1 mile on turf: 1988–1991, 1993–present 
  miles: 1978–1980 on main track, 1986–87 on Turf
 7 furlongs on main track: 1950 in Autumn Meet (Premiere Handicap)
 6 furlongs on main track: 1938–1941, 1944–1947, 1949, 1950 as Spring renewal (Preview Handicap), 1951–1977
 Not run in 1942–1943, 1948, 1981–1983, 1992

Winners

Other earlier winners

1968 – Kissin' George
1953 – Pet Bully

References

Graded stakes races in the United States
Horse races in California
Open mile category horse races
Grade 1 turf stakes races in the United States
Recurring sporting events established in 1938
Santa Anita Park
Breeders' Cup Challenge series
1938 establishments in California
Grade 1 stakes races in the United States